Eissportzentrum Chemnitz is an arena in Chemnitz, Germany.  It is primarily used for ice hockey. Eissportzentrum Chemnitz opened in 1958 and holds 3,978 people.

Indoor arenas in Germany
Indoor ice hockey venues in Germany
Sport in Chemnitz
Sports venues in Saxony